Ibrahim Jaaber (born February 3, 1984) is an American-born naturalized Bulgarian former professional basketball player. At 1.88 m (6'2") in height, he played at both the point guard and shooting guard positions. He also played for the senior Bulgarian national basketball team, despite being born in the United States.

College career
As a former men's college basketball player at the University of Pennsylvania, he won the Ivy League Player of the Year in his junior and senior years, in the process breaking the league's career record for steals (303) and finishing among the top pickpockets in college basketball (2nd nationally in steals his junior year and 3rd nationally in steals his senior year).  With Mark Zoller, Ibby also led the Quakers to three straight Ivy League titles between his sophomore and senior years; he also played well in the team's three NCAA Tournament games getting 16 points against Texas A&M and 15 against Texas and he scored 21 points when Penn visited a top North Carolina team. Jaaber will go down as one of the best players ever to play for the Quakers and is the all-time leader in steals at Penn and in the Ivy League.

Career college stats
 2003–2004 (Penn): Pts: 6.5 Rbs: 2.4 Stls: 1.3 Ast: .6
 2004–2005 (Penn): Pts: 11.5 Rbs: 4.6 Stls: 2.9 Ast: 2.8
 2005–2006 (Penn): Pts: 18.2 Rbs: 3.4 Stls: 3.3 Ast: 2.2 (Ivy League Player of the Year)
 2006–2007 (Penn): Pts: 15.9 Rbs: 4.5 Stls: 2.9 Ast: 5.2 (Ivy League Player of the Year, Big 5 Player of the Year, AP All-American Notable)
 Career: Pts: 13.3 Rbs: 3.8 Stls: 2.7 Ast: 2.8

Professional career
Ibrahim Jaaber was not drafted by any NBA teams, but he played for the Detroit Pistons' Summer League squad from July 7–14, 2007 and he subsequently signed a contract to play professionally for a Greek League team called Aigaleo. He then moved to the premiere EuroLeague to play with Lottomatica Roma. In the 2010 NBA Summer League, he played for the Los Angeles Lakers. In August 2010 he signed with AJ Milano.

On January 30, 2013, Jaaber announced that he is leaving his former team Žalgiris Kaunas due to personal reasons. He also stated that he will not play for any other European team. Jaaber explained in a letter to the club he left Lithuania because he could not stand to see the dances too suggestive of Zalgiris cheerleaders and he disagreed with advertisements appearing on T-shirts team. "I am well aware that this might prevent me from earning money through basketball for the rest of my life, but I am willing to make this sacrifice because of my beliefs (Islam)," he wrote.

National team career
Jaaber played internationally with the senior men's Bulgarian national basketball team.

Career statistics

EuroLeague

|-
| style="text-align:left;"| 2007–08
| style="text-align:left;"| Lottomatica Roma
| 6 || 1 || 22.4 || .405 || .273 || .286 || 3.3 || 1.5 || 2.5 || .3 || 7.5 || 6.5
|-
| style="text-align:left;"| 2008–09
| style="text-align:left;"| Lottomatica Roma
| 16 || 15 || 26.3 || .576 || .280 || .594 || 3.3 || 1.9 || 1.9 || .3 || 10.4 || 10.4
|-
| style="text-align:left;"| 2009–10
| style="text-align:left;"| Lottomatica Roma
| 10 || 10 || 31.0 || .463 || .225 || .625 || 4.4 || 2.5 || 2.2 || .1 || 10.4 || 8.8
|-
| style="text-align:left;"| 2010–11
| style="text-align:left;"| AJ Milano
| 10 || 1 || 24.4 || .588 || .353 || .750 || 1.7 || 2.4 || .7 || .3 || 10.8 || 9.6
|-
| style="text-align:left;"| 2012–13
| style="text-align:left;"| Zalgiris
| 14 || 10 || 21.1 || .515 || .333 || .619 || 2.2 || 2.2 || 1.9 || .1 || 5.9 || 7.4

References

External links
 Euroleague.net Profile
 Biography @ Pennathletics.net

Living people
1984 births
Aigaleo B.C. players
African-American basketball players
American expatriate basketball people in Greece
American expatriate basketball people in Iran
American expatriate basketball people in Italy
American expatriate basketball people in Lithuania
American men's basketball players
Basketball players from New Jersey
BC Žalgiris players
Bulgarian men's basketball players
Bulgarian people of American descent
Elizabeth High School (New Jersey) alumni
Naturalised citizens of Bulgaria
Olimpia Milano players
Pallacanestro Virtus Roma players
Penn Quakers men's basketball players
Petrochimi Bandar Imam BC players
Point guards
Shooting guards
Sportspeople from Elizabeth, New Jersey
21st-century African-American sportspeople
20th-century African-American people